Francesco Caccianiga (1700–1781) was an Italian painter and engraver.

He was born in Milan. In Bologna, he became a pupil of Marcantonio Franceschini. He afterwards visited Rome, where he established himself under the patronage of Marcantonio Borghese, 5th Prince of Sulmona, for whom he executed some considerable works in the Palazzo and the Villa Borghese. His principal works are at Ancona, where he painted several altar-pieces, among them, Marriage of the Virgin and Last Supper. A few engravings by him are known, one being The Death of Lucretia. He died in Rome.

References

1700 births
1781 deaths
Artists from Milan
18th-century Italian painters
Italian male painters
Italian engravers
Italian Baroque painters
Baroque engravers
18th-century Italian male artists